The Maryland Terrapins men's lacrosse team represents the University of Maryland in National Collegiate Athletic Association (NCAA) Division I lacrosse as a member of the Big Ten Conference. Maryland was a founding member of the Atlantic Coast Conference before withdrawing after the 2014 season.

Since 1924, Maryland has secured numerous national championship honors, including four NCAA tournament championships, eight Wingate Memorial Trophy titles and one United States Intercollegiate Lacrosse Association championship. They have reached 28 NCAA tournament semi-finals since 1971. Maryland is the only major college lacrosse team to have never finished a season with a losing record. The team is currently coached by John Tillman.

Johns Hopkins, located nearby in Baltimore, is considered the Terrapins' biggest rival. The two schools have played more than 100 times since the series began in 1895. Although Maryland does not officially recognize games that occurred prior to lacrosse becoming a varsity sport at Maryland in 1924. In 2015, the rivalry became a conference game, as Johns Hopkins joined the Big Ten Conference as an associate member in men's lacrosse. Other rivals include Virginia, Navy, Towson, and UMBC.

History
The Maryland program started as a club team in 1895. During its early years, Maryland teams competed against the best in lacrosse with games on record against Johns Hopkins, Penn State, Navy, Harvard, Cornell and others.

The team was elevated to varsity status in 1924. Since then, Maryland has never finished with a losing record, a feat unmatched by any other major college lacrosse team. The Terrapins have finished four seasons with a winning percentage of .500.

Under the guidance of coach R. V. Truitt, Maryland entered the United States Intercollegiate Lacrosse League (USILL) in 1924. In its first contest in the association, it snapped Navy's 46-game winning streak and then beat undefeated Johns Hopkins, the Southern Division championship team, 4–2. The following season, Maryland captured the Southern Division title by beating the Doug Turnbull-led Hopkins squad, 3–1.

In 1926, the USILL was succeeded by the United States Intercollegiate Lacrosse Association (USILA), which did not have a limitation on the number of member schools. For the next five decades, Maryland remained a national power, alongside Johns Hopkins, Navy, and St. John's. The dominance of these four schools located in the state of Maryland was due in large part to the high caliber of the sport at the interscholastic level. Lacrosse was the preeminent spring sport at the public Baltimore Polytechnic Institute and Baltimore City College, as well as the city's private high schools. The importance of lacrosse was magnified by the lack of any major professional teams in Baltimore until the creation of the Colts in 1947 and the return of the Orioles in 1954.

Maryland finished the 1928 season with a 9–1 record, the loss coming at the hands of Johns Hopkins. Three other association members finished with one loss: Hopkins, Navy, and Rutgers. The four squads were awarded Gold Medals as the best teams in the nation. That year, arrangements were made for the inclusion of a lacrosse exhibition at the 1928 Summer Olympics. American Olympic Committee president General Douglas MacArthur established a committee to organize the country's participation in the lacrosse event. Representation of the United States was determined by a tournament of intercollegiate and amateur teams that involved Maryland, Johns Hopkins, Rutgers, Army, Navy, and the Mount Washington Lacrosse Club. Maryland advanced to the final, where they were defeated by Hopkins in front of 15,000 spectators. In 1929, the undefeated St. John's Johnnies handed Maryland its first homefield loss in thirteen years.

Before the 1932 Summer Olympics in Los Angeles, lacrosse proponents arranged for another exhibition tournament. To decide the representative for the United States, the American Olympic Lacrosse Committee held an eight-team single-elimination tournament featuring Maryland, Johns Hopkins, Syracuse, St. John's, Rutgers, Crescent Athletic Club, Mount Washington Lacrosse Club, and an all-star team composed of American Indian players from the Six Nations. Maryland defeated Mount Washington at Baltimore Stadium in front of 6,000 spectators in a doubleheader that also featured Johns Hopkins narrowly beat St. John's. In the semifinals, a small crowd of 500 watched Maryland beat the Crescents and Hopkins beat Rutgers in foul rainy weather. Hopkins defeated Maryland in the final before a crowd of 5,000 to secure their place as the United States representatives for the Olympics.

In 1936, Maryland coach Jack Faber guided the undefeated Terps to secure the inaugural Wingate Memorial Trophy, awarded to the USILA champions. The next year, Maryland finished undefeated again and shared the national co-championship with William F. Logan's Princeton. Faber led Maryland to back-to-back outright USILA titles in 1939 led by Jim Meade and Rip Hewitt, and in 1940 led by Milton Mulitz and Oscar Nevares.

In 1955 and 1956, co-head coaches Faber and Al Heagy guided the Terrapins to two more undefeated seasons and consecutive national championships. Maryland split the USILA championship with two other one-loss teams, Army and Johns Hopkins, in 1959.

In 1967, Maryland suffered one loss to Navy, that decade's dominant team, but Hopkins in turn defeated the Midshipmen which resulted in a three-way tie for the championship between the trio.

On March 29, 2009, the Maryland–Virginia regular season match resulted in the longest lacrosse game in NCAA history, extending into seven overtime periods. An unintentional whistle by the officiating staff negated what would have been a game-winning goal by Terrapins attackman Grant Catalino in the first overtime. Virginia went on to win with a goal in the seventh overtime, 10–9, and preserved its perfect record, 11–0, while Maryland slid to 6–3.

In 2011, Maryland defeated first-seeded Duke to recapture the ACC tournament championship after a six-year hiatus. Attackman Grant Catalino was named the tournament MVP.

On May 29, 2017, Maryland defeated 3rd-seeded Ohio State to win its third NCAA national championship (12th overall) and end the national title drought that began after its last championship in 1975.

On May 30, 2022, Maryland defeated 7th-seeded Cornell to win its fourth NCAA national championship (13th overall). Finishing the season at 18-0, the Terrapins became the third undefeated champions since the NCAA tournament expanded to 16 teams and the first since 2006.

Players
Since 1922, a total of 124 first-team All-American honors have been bestowed upon Maryland players. Six Terrapins have received All-American honors each of their four years: Charles Wicker (1953–56), Frank Urso (1973–76), Bob Ott (1976–79), Bob Boniello (1977-80), Peter Worstell (1977–81), and Joe Walters (2003-2008). Frank Urso is one of just four college men's lacrosse players to be named a first-team All-American all four years.

In 2017, Matt Rambo was the first Maryland men's player to receive the Tewaaraton Award for the best men's collegiate lacrosse player in the country. In 2021, Jared Bernhardt became the second Maryland men's player to win the award. In 2022, Logan Wisnauskas became the third Maryland men's player to win the award.

Coaches

Championships

National championships
Starting in 1926, the United States Intercollegiate Lacrosse Association (USILA) began rating college lacrosse teams and awarding gold medals to the top teams. Maryland was the recipient of one of these in 1928, alongside Johns Hopkins, Navy, and Rutgers, all of whom suffered just one regular season collegiate defeat. From 1936, the USILA awarded the Wingate Memorial Trophy to the regular season intercollegiate champions. In 1971, the National Collegiate Athletic Association began hosting a men's lacrosse tournament to determine the national champions.

Conference regular season championships

Conference tournament championships
The Atlantic Coast Conference has held a men's lacrosse tournament since 1989. The Big Ten Conference began hosting a men's lacrosse tournament in 2015.

Season results
The following is a list of Marylands's results by season as an NCAA Division I program:

{| class="wikitable"

|- align="center"

Alumni in the Premier Lacrosse League (22)

References

External links
 
 Maryland Men's Lacrosse Record Book

NCAA Division I men's lacrosse teams
Maryland Terrapins men's lacrosse
1895 establishments in Maryland
Lacrosse clubs established in 1895